The Best of The Easybeats Volume 2 is the second compilation album by the Australian rock group The Easybeats. The album was first released on October 9, 1969 by the group's Australian label Albert Productions.  The compilation album was released to coincide with the band's 1969 Australian tour.

The compilation was later re-issued on the budget Drum label in 1974.  It has never been officially issued on compact disc or digitally.  However, the songs not released on their original studio albums, can be found on CD throughout the Repertoire reissues of Friday On My Mind, Vigil and the bonus tracks of the  Friends CD.

Reception

On release, the album received mixed reviews from the music press due to its use of "demo" recordings, on the album's first side.  In their review, Go-Set commented: "Apart from the dubious production often the Easys are not trying to be themselves but are content to put down the song idea, perhaps even with someone in mind for them".  The songs on the first side included songs Harry Vanda and George Young had given to other Australian groups, whose versions were already released before this album.  Commercially, the album did poorly.

1975 re-release

The album was reissued in June 1975 on the budget label Drum records, along with the first volume.  The reissue contains the same song listing, but alternate, previously unreleased versions of some titles.

 "Hello, How Are You" - an earlier, more psychedelic sounding recording than the released version.
 "Lay Me Down and Die" - this version of the instrumental track contains a lead vocal with lyrics.
 "Land of Make Believe" - an alternate mix of the song.

These versions of "Hello, How Are You" and "Lay Me Down and Die" would also appear on the 1980 compilation album Absolute Anthology. Both these songs can also be found as bonus track on the Repertoire Records CD release of Vigil.  The alternate mix of "Land of Make Believe" is exclusive to the 1975 reissue.

Track listing

Side A

Side B

References
Albert Music - Best of The Easybeats - Volume 2

External links
 

The Easybeats albums
1969 greatest hits albums
Albums produced by Glyn Johns
Albert Productions compilation albums
Albums recorded at Olympic Sound Studios